Thornden is a surname. Notable people with the surname include:

 John Thornden, English 16th-century bishop and university administrator
 Richard Thornden, 16th-century priest

See also
 Thornton (surname)